Uchathula Shiva is a 2016 Indian Tamil-language action film which was directed by Jaypee, starring Karan and Neha Ratnakaran in the leading roles. Featuring music composed by Vidyasagar, the film is produced by Karan's wife, Devi Karan and marks the actor's first home production. The film had a theatrical release on 16 September 2016 to mixed reviews. The film also marked the last featured film for the actor Karan, in leading roles and further retirement from the film industry.

Plot 
An easy-going taxi driver named Shiva (Karan) gives out advice on hygiene and the need to be "professional" to an idli vendor on street, thus establishing himself as someone with a humanitarian side, in the very first scene. Further, his conversation with Gnanasambandam (who plays himself) in a car and the way he talks to his over-concerned mother over phone (Kovai Sarala's voice) brings him closer to the audience. However, within no time, things go haywire when the story actually kicks off. Nila (Neha Ratnakaran) is being chased by a prominent drug dealer named Albert (Aadukalam Naren) in the town, and Shiva comes to her rescue and offers a lift. He tries to contact people who are close to her to ensure safety. Little does he know that he is inviting trouble, as things start going beyond his control. What follows is an unexpected series of incidents.

Cast 
Karan as Shiva
Neha Ratnakaran as Vidya/Nila
Aadukalam Naren as Albert
Ilavarasu as Ondipuli
Ramesh Khanna as Sundar
Sangili Murugan as Accused
Ashwin Raja as Accused
Kovai Sarala (voice) as Shiva's mother
Kanal Kannan as Special appearance
Yashmith in a cameo appearance

Production 
The film became Karan's first home production, with the actor revealing that he chose to do a "light-hearted entertainer" rather than a serious film. Neha Ratnakaran was signed on to portray the leading female role in the film, which progressed throughout early 2016. The project also marked the return of composer Vidyasagar after a brief sabbatical from Tamil films.

Music 

The music and background score for the film were composed by Vidyasagar and lyrics written by Vairamuthu. Director Dharani made his debut as playback singer with this film.

Release 
The film had a theatrical release across Tamil Nadu on 16 September 2016, and opened to mixed reviews from critics. A critic from The Times of India wrote "a few scenes appear wacky, as the filmmaker seems to be confused about whether to approach these sequences in a serious or comical manner" and "as a result, the audience, too, are left confused".

References

External links 

2016 films
Indian action comedy films
Films scored by Vidyasagar
2010s Tamil-language films
2016 action comedy films